West Park is the premier park in Long Eaton, Derbyshire, England. It is also the location of the town's indoor leisure centre.

History
West Park is near the historic centre of Long Eaton on the opposite side of Erewash Canal, the area was used for Lace factories and part of the park is within The Lace Factory Conservation area. It is an Edwardian park with Long Eaton Borough council purchasing the land that now comprises the park in seven parcels starting in 1882 and finishing in 1952.

Landmarks

The gates and gatepiers to West Park were made by Robert Bakewell in the early 1700s and are Grade II* listed by Historic England, they were purchased from Aston Hall, Aston on Trent, Derbyshire and erected in 1928. A Fishpond Shelter was also installed after purchase from Aston Hall and there is a historic bandstand.

Facilities

The town's leisure centre is located at the park. In addition there is football, two cricket clubs, rugby pitches, baseball pitches, tennis courts, bowling greens, an outdoor gym, a cafe, formal gardens, a bandstand, a skatepark, two children's play area, a splashpad, walking, cycle paths and croquet. A Parkrun takes place in the park every Saturday morning. Long Eaton Rugby Club are based at the park.

The Park once had a narrow gauge passenger railway which was opened in 1966. It was of 2ft gauge and used a 4 wheeled Ruston diesel and  an ex NCB 4-wheeled open carriage It closed circa 1970.

See also
Listed buildings in Long Eaton

References

Long Eaton
Parks and open spaces in Derbyshire